Dalbergia boniana is a species of legume in the family Fabaceae.
It is found only in Vietnam.

References

Sources

boniana
Endemic flora of Vietnam
Data deficient plants
Taxonomy articles created by Polbot